Pageants is an indie rock duo formed in 2011 and based in Long Beach, California. Its members consist of Rebecca Coleman (formerly of Avi Buffalo) on vocals, guitar and keys, and Devin O'Brien on bass and guitar.  "Coleman’s new band employs the shrill harmonies she lent to her former act’s breakthrough debut album last year," while lending itself towards "the lonely guitar jangle of early Liz Phair" rather "than Avi Buffalo's axe heroics."

Discography

Singles
 2018: “Forever”
 2013: "Musings Of The Tide" b/w "August Moon" (7" release)

References

External links 
 
Pageants on Bandcamp
"Words As Pictures" live video
"Deep Ring" live video

Musicians from Long Beach, California